Club Deportivo Artístico Navalcarnero is a football team based in Navalcarnero, in the autonomous community of Madrid, Spain. Founded in 1961, it plays in Segunda División RFEF – Group 1, holding home games at the 2,500-seat Estadio Mariano González.

History 

The team was founded in 1961 and registered in the Castilian Federation on August 11 that year to be able to play in lower categories of the Spanish football league system. In the 1987–88 season Navalcarnero debuted for the first time in the Tercera División.

On the 6th of January 2021 Navalcarnero recorded one of their most impressive results in recent history by beating UD Las Palmas 1-0 at home in the second round of the 2020–21 Copa del Rey. Eleven days later in the round of 32 the team earned their most impressive result to date by beating La Liga side SD Eibar 3-1 at home to progress to the round of 16 for the first time in their history.

Season to season

6 seasons in Segunda División B
1 season in Segunda División RFEF
23 seasons in Tercera División

Players

Current squad

Uniform

Sponsor: Navalcarnero City Hall
Sports equipment: Joma

Former players
  José Freijo
 José Antonio

References

External links
Official website 
Futbolme team profile 
Estadios de España 

Football clubs in the Community of Madrid
Association football clubs established in 1961
Divisiones Regionales de Fútbol clubs
1961 establishments in Spain